Bhangra is a type of non-traditional music of Punjab originating in the  Majha area of Punjab. It is a type of upbeat popular music associated with the Punjabi diaspora in India.  The style has its origins in the folk music of Punjab as well as western pop music of the 1970s and 1980s.  Prior to this musical fusion, Bhangra existed only as a dance form in the native Punjab.  This Punjabi music was unique in that it was not traditional nor did it seek any authenticity.  While the traditional folk music of Punjab has a set of melodies that are used by various singers, Bhangra was a form of strict "band culture" in that new melodies were composed for each song.  Therefore, the musicians were as important as the singers.

Origins
The roots of modern bhangra music date back to the Sikh Punjabi community in Punjab during the 1960s. An early pop music and modern recording artist/group of this type of music in the United Kingdom was Bhujhangy Group, founded by Tarlochan Singh Bilga, Balbir Singh Khanpur, Gurpal, Rajinder Dhona, and Dalvir Kahanpuri in Birmingham in 1971. Bhujhangy Group's first major hit was "Bhabiye Akh Larr Gayee" Lyric by Tarlochan Singh Bilga the early 1975s, released on Birmingham's Oriental Star Agencies label. This was the first song to combine traditional Asian music with modern Western instruments.

Differences from folk music
Although bhangra music used many of the elements of Punjabi folk music (e.g., "Bakkrey Bulaaney" – the goat herding vocalizations), it was also radically different in its embrace of modernity. The song structure of a typical bhangra song featured four verses, a chorus, along with two alternating instrumental bridge sections. (e.g., CVB1CVB2CVB1CVB2C.) Hence it featured more musicianship than its folk predecessor.

United Kingdom

1970s
A modern and commercial form of bhangra music was said to rise in Britain in the 1970s by Punjabi immigrants who took their native folk music and began experimenting by altering it using instruments from their host country. The new genre quickly became popular in Britain replacing Punjabi folk singers due to it being heavily influenced in Britain by the infusion of rock music and a need to move away from the simple and repetitive Punjabi folk music. It indicated the development of a self-conscious and distinctively rebellious British Asian youth culture centred on an experiential sense of self, e.g., language, gesture, bodily signification, desires, etc., in a situation in which tensions with British culture and racist elements in British society had resulted in alienation in many minority ethnic groups, fostered a sense of need for an affirmation of a positive identity and culture, and provided a platform for British Punjabi males to assert their masculinity.

In the 1980s, distributed by record labels such as Multitone Records, bhangra artists were selling over 30,000 cassettes a week in the UK, but no artists reached the Top 40 UK chart despite these artists outselling popular British ones; most of the bhangra cassette sales were not through the large UK record stores, whose sales were those recorded by the Official UK Charts Company for creating their rankings.

The group Alaap formed in 1977, co-founded by Channi Singh and Harjeet Gandhi who both hailed from Southall, a Punjabi area in London. Their album Teri Chunni De Sitaray was released in 1982 by Multitone. Alaap was considered the first and original superstar bhangra band formed in the United Kingdom. Channi Singh has been awarded the OBE by the Queen for his services to bhangra music and services/charity for the British Asian community. Co-founder Harjeet Gandhi died in 2003.

The 1980s is commonly known as the golden age, or the age of bhangra music, which lasted roughly from 1985 to 1993. The primary emphasis during these times was on the melody/riff, played out usually on a synthesizer, harmonium, accordion or a guitar. The folk instruments were rarely used

One of the biggest bhangra stars of the last several decades is Malkit Singh and his band Golden Star. Singh was born in June 1963 in the village of Hussainpur in Punjab. He attended the Lyallpur Khalsa College, Jalandhar, in Punjab in 1980 to study for a bachelor of arts degree. There he met his mentor, Professor Inderjit Singh, who taught him Punjabi folk singing and bhangra dancing. Due to Singh's tutelage, Malkit entered and won song contests during this time. In 1983, he won a gold medal at the Guru Nanak Dev University in Amritsar, Punjab, for performing his song "Gurh Nalon Ishq Mitha", which later featured on his first album, Nach Gidhe Wich, Lyric by Tarlochan Singh Bilga  released in 1985. This album was created with  Manager, Tarlochan Singh Bilga(TSB). The band has toured 27 countries. Malkit has been awarded the MBE by the Queen for his services to bhangra music.

Bhangra boy band, the Sahotas, were composed of five brothers from Wolverhampton. Their music is a fusion of bhangra, rock and dance.

Heera, formed by Bhupinder Bhindi and fronted by Kumar and Dhami, was one of the most popular bands of the 1980s. 

Bands like Alaap and Heera incorporated rock-influenced beats into bhangra, because it enabled "Asian youth to affirm their identities positively" within the broader environment of alternative rock as an alternative way of expression. However, some believe that the progression of bhangra music created an "intermezzo culture" post-India's partition, within the unitary definitions of Southeast Asians within the diaspora, thus "establishing a brand new community in their home away from home".

Several other influential groups appeared around the same time, including The Saathies, Premi Group, Bhujungy Group, and Apna Sangeet. Apna Sangeet, best known for their hit "Mera Yaar Vajavey Dhol", re-formed for charity in May 2009 after a break-up.

When Bhangra and General Indian sounds and lyrics were combined, British-Asian artists began incorporating them in their music. Some Asian artists such as Bally Sagoo and Talvin Singh are creating their own form of British hip-hop.

This era also brought about bhangra art, which like the bhangra music it represented was rebellious. Unlike folk music art, which consisted of a picture of the folk singer, bhangra recordings had details such as distinctive artwork, logos, clever album names and band/musician listings (who played what).

Folk backlash
Unlike bhangra, folk music depends on a set number of traditional melodies that may be hundreds of years old. Each new singer simply writes new lyrics using one of those melodies.

In the mid-1990s, many artists, attracted to the economics of a bandless singer only act that technology such as karaoke machines now enabled, returned to the original, traditional folk beats away from bhangra music, often incorporating more dhol drum beats and tumbi. This time also saw the rise of several young Punjabi folk singers as a backlash to bhangra music. They were aided by DJs who mixed hip hop samples with folk singing.

Beginning around 1994, there was a trend towards the use of samples (often sampled from mainstream hip hop) mixed with traditional folk rhythm instruments, such as the tumbi and dhol. Using folk instruments and hip-hop samples, along with relatively inexpensive folk vocals imported from Punjab, Punjabi folk music was able to cause the decline of bhangra music.

Pioneering DJs instrumental in the decline of bhangra were Bally Sagoo and Panjabi MC. As DJs who were initially hired by bhangra labels to remix the original recordings on the label's roster (OSA and Nachural respectively), they along with the record labels quickly found that remixing folk singers from India was much cheaper than working with outsourced bhangra bands.

A pioneering folk singer that was instrumental in bhangra's demise was Jazzy B, who debuted in 1992. Having sold over 55,000 copies of his third album, Folk and Funky, he is now one of the best-selling Punjabi folk artists in the world, with a vocal style likened to that of Kuldip Manak.

Other influential folk artists include Surinder Shinda – famous for his "Putt Jattan De" – Harbhajan Mann, Manmohan Waris, Sarbjit Cheema, Hans Raj Hans, Sardool Sikander, B21, Paaras and Bombay Talkie.

By the end of the 1990s, bhangra music had largely declined and been replaced with Punjabi folk singers. The same folk singers which bhangra bands had replaced a decade earlier were being utilized by DJs to make relatively inexpensive live music on laptops. This "folkhop" genre was short lived as records could not be officially released due to nonclearance copyrights on samples used to create the "beat". This continued until the end of the century. Folk-hop record labels such as Hi-Tech were investigated by BPI (British Phonographic Industry) for copyright infringement by way of uncleared samples on releases by folk DJs such as DJ Sanj.

Toward the end of the decade, bhangra continued to decline, with folk-hop artists such as Bally Sagoo and Apache Indian signing with international recording labels Sony and Island. Moreover, Multitone Records, one of the major recording labels associated with bhangra in Britain in the 1980s and 1990s, was bought by BMG. A recent Pepsi commercial launched in Britain featured South Asian actors and Punjabi folk music.

2000s remixes

Punjabi folk remixed with hip-hop, known as folkhop, is most often produced when folk vocals are purchased online to be remixed in a studio. Folk vocals are usually sung to traditional melodies, that are often repeated with new lyrics.

Some South Asian DJs, especially in America, have mixed Punjabi folk music with house, reggae, and hip-hop to add a different flavor to Punjabi folk. These remixes continued to gain popularity as the 1990s came to an end. 

A notable remix artist is Bally Sagoo, a Punjabi-Sikh, Anglo-Indian raised in Birmingham, England. Sagoo described his music as "a bit of tablas, a bit of the Indian sound. But bring on the bass lines, bring on the funky-drummer beat, bring on the James Brown samples", to Time magazine in 1997. He was recently signed by Sony. Daler Mehndi, a Punjabi singer from India has a type of music known as "folk pop". Mehndi has released tracks such as "Bolo Ta Ra Ra" and "Ho Jayegee Balle Balle". His song "Tunak Tunak Tun" was released in 1998.

Canada and the United States

Punjabi immigrants have encouraged the growth of Punjabi folk music in the Western hemisphere rather than bhangra music. The bhangra industry has grown in North America much less than in the United Kingdom.

North American (non bhangra) folk artists such as Manmohan Waris, Jazzy Bains, Kamal Heer, Harbhajan Mann, Sarabjit Cheema, and Debi Makhsoospuri have emerged and the remix market has grown.

In 2001, Punjabi folk, and its hip-hop form, folkhop, began to exert an influence over US R&B music, when Missy Elliott released the folkhop-influenced song "Get Ur Freak On". In 2003, a version of Panjabi MC's "Mundian To Bach Ke" ("Beware of the Boys") featured U.S. rapper Jay-Z. Additionally, American rapper Pras of The Fugees recorded tracks with British alternative bhangra band Swami. American singer and actress Selena Gomez released her bhangra-influenced single "Come & Get It" from her first solo album Stars Dance in 2013.

Lyrics

Bhangra lyrics, which generally cover social issues or love, are sung in Punjabi. Bhangra lyrics were generally kept deliberately simple by the creators of the genre because the youth did not understand complex lyrics. Traditional Punjabi folk lyrics are generally more complex and often tell the tales of Punjabi history. There are many bhangra songs devoted to Punjabi pride themes and Punjabi heroes. The lyrics are tributes to the cultural traditions of Punjab. In particular, many bhangra tracks have been written about Udham Singh and Bhagat Singh. Less serious topics include beautiful women with their colourful duppattas. Lyrics can also be about crops and the coming of a new season. Bhangra is sung fiercely with strong lyrics often yelling: "balle balle" or "chakde phate", which refer to celebration and/or pride.

Notable bhangra or Punjabi lyricists include Harbans Jandu who wrote "Giddhian Di Rani".

Instruments

Punjabi instruments contribute to bhangra. Originally this was primarily the dhol. The 20th century has brought changes to the instruments that define bhangra, to include the tumbi, sarangi, dholak (smaller than the dhol), flute, zither, fiddle, harmonium, tabla, guitar, mandolin, saxophone, synthesizer, drum set, and other Western instruments. Perhaps the most famous Bhangra instrument is the dhol. It is a double-sided barrel drum that creates the beat to which Bhangra is danced. The person who plays the instrument, the dholi, plays various beats to create the different Bhangra segments, such as Dhamaal, Jhummar, One side of the dhol has thicker skin, which creates a deeper sound, and the other side has a thinner skin, resulting in a higher-pitched sound. Two sticks are used to play the dhol instrument. The thicker stick, called the dagga, is used to play the bass side. The thinner tilli is used to play the treble side. Both sticks are usually made of wood or bamboo.

The string instruments include the guitar (both electrical), bass, sitar, tumbi, veena, violin and sarangi. The snare, toms, dhadd, dafli, dholki, and damru are the other drums. The tumbi, originally played by folk artists such as Lalchand Yamla Jatt and Kuldip Manak in true folk recordings and then notably used by Chamkila, a Punjabi folk (not bhangra) singer, is a high-tone, single-string instrument and Chimta by (Late) Alam Lohar.

Cultural impact and resurgence of Punjabi folk music in the West

The third and fourth generation are generally unable to speak Punjabi if their parents could hardly speak it. There is a move towards Punjabi folk music which is the purest form of Punjabi music. Much of the youth struggle to understand the lyrics, although, there are some children and young adults who have maintained their folk roots. Another reason why some fans express an anti-folk sentiment is that many folk songs were written for the dominate Jatts clan whereas Sikhs do not believe in castes, so they disapproved of Punjabi folk music. However, today with artists like Jazzy B, PMC, Sukhshinder Shinda and Diljit Dosanjh, Punjabi folk has increased in popularity although it is fused in some cases. iTunes has catalogs of many Punjabi folk singers available.

Another cause of the resurgence of Punjabi folk music is due to the increased popularity of bhangra in areas like the UK, Canada and U.S. Bhangra has become more accessible through social media platforms such as YouTube and Instagram, for the younger generation. In addition, multiple universities, across the UK, US and Canada have teams as well as academies being set up by senior dancers separate from universities. This resurgence has led to a desire for more traditional folk songs and beats, but also a learning opportunity for children of their cultures.

Derivatives

Bhangragga
Bhangragga or bhangramuffin is a term for the style of music incorporating elements of Bhangra and dancehall (or ragga, short for the word Raggamuffin) created by British Asian producers Simon and Diamond on the debut album by Apache Indian No Reservations (1993).
The sound is very percussion-heavy – a distinct holdover from Bhangra – with a propulsive beat clearly designed for dancing. The dancehall influence can be felt through the use of pre-programmed music, similar to Dancehall "riddims".
Lyrically, the style features a combination of Sub-Continental-accented (usually Indian) vocals delivered in the clipped style associated with dancehall – and sometimes including the Patois of the latter style.
This style is almost exclusively a British phenomenon, as the two cultures involved in its genesis mix reasonably freely there. The most successful exponent, however, is Apache Indian, who had a worldwide hit with "Boom Shack-A-Lak", which was included on the soundtrack to the film Dumb and Dumber, among others.

See also
List of bhangra artists
Music of Punjab
Punjabi culture
Asian Underground
Multitone records
Dhol
Punjab region
Music of the United Kingdom

References

External links

Where Bhangra Lives
Bhangra News, Music Videos & Interviews
www.Bhangra.org
House Of Bhangra
 India Music – The first ever Indian Music domain and web site registered.

 
Punjabi music
Indian styles of music
Pakistani styles of music
Punjabi words and phrases
British culture
Indian diaspora in the United Kingdom
Pakistani diaspora in the United Kingdom
Dance music genres
Punjabi diaspora
Pop music genres